Nancy Astor is a British television series which originally aired on BBC Two in 1982. It portrays the career of Nancy Astor, the American-born socialite and Conservative Party politician who pioneered the role of women in the House of Commons.

Main cast
 Lisa Harrow as Nancy Astor 
 Lise Hilboldt as Phyllis Langhorne
 James Fox as Waldorf Astor
 Dan O'Herlihy as Chiswell 'Chillie' Langhorne 
 Nigel Havers as Bobby Shaw
 Pierce Brosnan as Robert Gould Shaw
 David Warner as Philip Kerr
 Erick Ray Evans as Sam
 Sylvia Syms as Nanaire Langhorne
 Lillian Silverstone as Irene
 William Hope as Harry Langhorne
 Dallas Adams as Dana Gibson
 Neil McCarthy as Reverend Neve
 Bernard Brown as Robert Brand
 Natalie Caron as Emma
 Paul McDowell as Lee
 Julian Glover as Lord Revelstoke
 Daniel Chatto as Billy Grenfell
 Isabelle Lucas as  Aunt Liza 
 Edmond Bennett as Stationmaster
 Victoria Burgoyne as Lucy
 Jeff Harding as Freddie
 Robert Arden as Quincy Shaw
 Richard Trent as Groom
 Terence Brooka s Speaker
 Jon Croft as Parr
 Desmond Cullum-Jones as Webb
 Marsha Fitzalan as Wissie Astor
 Mary Healey as Rose
 Rosalind Knight as Margot Asquith
 Robert Mill as Speaker
 John Paul as Balfour
 Robert Raglan as MP
 Hugh Thomas as Mackenzie
 Fraser Wilson as Henry Douglas-Pennant
 David Yelland as David Astor
 Annabelle Lanyon as Nancy Langhorne, as a girl
 Jeni Toksvig as Phyllis Langhorne, as a girl

References

Bibliography
 Vahimagi, Tise . British Television: An Illustrated Guide. Oxford University Press, 1996.

External links
 

1980s British drama television series
1982 British television series debuts
1982 British television series endings
BBC television dramas
British political drama television series
English-language television shows
Television series set in the 1910s
Television shows set in London